Isington is a hamlet in the East Hampshire district of Hampshire, England. It lies just south of the A31 road, a mile (1.6 km) southwest of the village of Bentley and four miles (6.4 km) northeast of the market town of Alton. At the 2011 Census the Post Office confirm that the population was included in the civil parish of Binsted.

The nearest railway station is Bentley, 1.1 miles (1.8 km) east of the hamlet.

Isington Mill was the home of Bernard Montgomery, 1st Viscount Montgomery of Alamein.

References

External links

 Hampshire Treasures Volume 6 (East Hampshire) pages 45, 48, 52, and 53

Villages in Hampshire